"The Lone Woman" was an American television film broadcast on December 26, 1957, as part of the second season of the CBS television series Playhouse 90. Al C. Ward wrote the teleplay. Kathryn Grayson, Scott Brady, Vincent Price, and Raymond Burr starred. The production was filmed on location in Tucson, Arizona.

Plot
Set in Colorado in 1830, the owner of a trading post seeks to annul the marriage between his brother and a Cheyenne woman.

Reception
Television critic Dwight Nelson wrote that the production was "occasionally tedious", but praised the "brawl" in the performance of Kathryn Grayson. Nelson also wrote that Vincent Price "had the most fun as an evil character."

Another critic, Richard Milne, called it a "high-class program" and opined that "the cast was excellent."

Cast
The following performers received screen credit for their performances:

 Kathryn Grayson - Lone Woman
 Scott Brady - William Bent
 Vincent Price - Jesse White
 Raymond Burr - Charles Bent
 Jack Lord - Jim Kester
 Buddy Baer - Angel
 Harry Carey Jr. - Cliff Eastland

References

1957 television films
1957 American television episodes
Playhouse 90 (season 2) episodes